Kozlukadı  is a village in Devrek District, Zonguldak Province, Turkey. It is located approximately 159 km north-west of Ankara

References

Villages in Devrek District